Nicolae Mișu (also Nicholas Mishu; 18 January 1893 – 1 January 1973) was a Romanian tennis player and diplomat. He competed at the 1924 Summer Olympics and was also a member of Romanian Davis Cup team. His father served as the Minister of Foreign Affairs of Romania.

Tennis career

Wins

References

External links
 
 
 

1893 births
1973 deaths
Romanian male tennis players
Olympic tennis players of Romania
Tennis players at the 1924 Summer Olympics